Daniel Hillel (13 September 1930 – 9 March 2021) was an Israeli–American agronomist, researcher and author. Hillel was the World Food Prize laureate for 2012.

Life 
Hillel was born in Los Angeles, United States. He was raised in Palestine and later Israel. He lived on a kibbutz, traditional agriculture based communities in Israel. On returning to the States he completed his high school, and went on to study agronomy from University of Georgia and earth sciences from Rutgers University. In 1957 he completed his doctorate in soil physics and ecology at Hebrew University of Jerusalem, followed by two years as a postdoctoral researcher at University of California. During the 1950s, Hillel took part in Israel's first effort to map its agriculture related resources. He then joined the agriculture community at Sde Boker. In the coming decades, he would use his expertise in irrigation to help improve agricultural output in 30 countries. Hillel was on the staff of Goddard Institute for Space Studies.

Bibliography

References 

1930 births
2021 deaths
American agronomists
Israeli agronomists
People from Los Angeles